The Helensvale Hornets were formed in 1991 the Helensvale Hornets currently field teams in all junior grades of the Gold Coast Rugby League.
The club is based at Robert Dalley Park, Helensvale, Queensland and the club's Gold Coast Titans Ambassadors are David Mead and Beau Henry.

Notable Coaches

Stewart 'Rexxy' Galvin (2013-2015)

Stewart was relieved of his coaching duties after numerous indiscretions with match officials during Junior Rugby League games. One of these indiscretions involved throwing a water bottle at an On Field Referee.

He still lives on the Gold Coast but has kept out of the coaching limelight since.

Jason Howard

See also

List of rugby league clubs in Australia

References

External links
 Official site
Facebook
Titans4Tomorrow club profile

Rugby league teams on the Gold Coast, Queensland
Rugby clubs established in 1991
1991 establishments in Australia